Veslsvulten  is a mountain in Innlandet county, Norway. The mountain lies just inside the boundaries of Rondane National Park. It is located to the west of the mountains Rondvasshøgde, Vinjeronden, and Rondeslottet. The mountain Hornflågene lies to the southeast of this mountain.

See also
List of mountains of Norway

References

Mountains of Innlandet
Folldal
Sel